The Washington tree is a giant sequoia in the Giant Forest Grove in Tulare County, California, within Sequoia National Park. It is named after George Washington, first President of the United States. Until it partially collapsed in January 2005, the Washington tree was the second largest tree in the world (after the General Sherman tree). Though badly damaged, the tree is still living.

Before damage
The tree was studied in 1999 by scientists from Humboldt State University and University of Washington. The significance of this finding is that the volume of wood in the tree had been greatly overestimated by previous measurements.

Damage and collapse

In September 2003, a fire caused by a lightning strike damaged the tree's crown. National Park Service officials decided to let the fire burn without human intervention.

The structurally weakened tree partially collapsed in January 2005, as the result of a heavy snow load in the remaining portion of its crown. The tree lost more than half its height, most of its branches, and much of the trunk, including the entire hollow upper portion of the trunk.

The Washington tree is no longer one of the top ten largest giant sequoias, though the National Park Service still lists it as the second largest, due to current documentation policy (trees are calculated as if they did not suffer damage). Even in its damaged state, the tree may not be dying, as it still has half a dozen significant branches. Many other sequoias have survived with less foliage, and the tree might live decades or centuries longer.

See also

 List of largest giant sequoias
 List of individual trees

References

Individual giant sequoia trees
Sequoia National Park